The Bloom Township High School District 206 is a public high school district that serves Bloom Township, Illinois, United States.  The district consists of 3,558 students in grades 9-12 in two high schools and one alternative high school.

Administration

District 206’s administration consists of an elected school board and paid executive staff. The school board consists of seven members including one president, vice president, and secretary. The members are elected on odd years in the spring and serve four year terms.

The president, vice president, and secretary are nominated and voted on by members of the school board during its organizational meeting. Illinois state law requires each school board to hold an organizational meeting following the election. During the organizational meeting the board must also seat new members and establish a regular meeting schedule.

District 206’s executive staff consists of:  superintendent, two assistant superintendents, director of special education, alternative principal, and director of athletics.

School Report Card (Performance)

The ACT assessment for the graduating class of 2010 was lower on all subjects compared to the state average.

The District's overall Prairie State Achievement Examination (PSAE) performance falls below the state average.

Current Administration
School Board

Executive Administration

High schools
Bloom High School
Bloom Trail High School

References

External links
 District Website

School districts in Cook County, Illinois
Chicago Heights, Illinois